James Loudon  (May 24, 1841 – December 29, 1916) was a Canadian professor of mathematics and physics and President of the University of Toronto from 1892 to 1906. He was the first Canadian-born professor at the University of Toronto.

Biography
Loudon was educated at the Toronto Grammar School, Upper Canada College, and the University of Toronto, where he received a B.A. in 1862 and an M.A. in 1864. Initially a tutor in classics, he soon moved to mathematics, eventually becoming the professor of mathematics and physics at University College in 1875, succeeding his teacher John Bradford Cherriman. In 1887 he became professor of physics only, and became president of the University in 1892.

He visited the United Kingdom to attend the 450th jubilee of the University of Glasgow in June 1901, and received an honorary doctorate (LL.D) from the university.

References

External links
 
 
 
 
 James Loudon archival papers held at the University of Toronto Archives and Records Management Services

1841 births
1916 deaths
Canadian physicists
Fellows of the Royal Society of Canada
Presidents of the University of Toronto